KCCT (1150 kHz) is a commercial AM radio station licensed to Corpus Christi, Texas.  It is owned by Manuel Davila, Jr., and airs a classic hits format, focusing on pop and rhythmic hits of the 1980s and 90s.  The studios, offices and transmitter are off Benys Road in Corpus Christi.  Programming is also heard on FM translator K281AV at 104.1 MHz.  The station calls itself "Retro 104.1."

History
On May 6, 1954, KCCT first signed on.  It was a daytimer, owned by the International Radio Company.  KCCT was a Spanish-language station through most of its history, aimed at the Mexican-American community in and around Corpus Christi.  In the early 1980s, KCCT was given nighttime authorization by the Federal Communications Commission to broadcast at 1000 watts by day and 500 watts at night, using a directional antenna at all times to protect other stations on AM 1150.

On June 2, 2017, KCCT changed its format from Americana and Texas-oriented country music to classic hits, branded as "Retro 104.1."

References

External links

Classic hits radio stations in the United States
CCT